The Finlay River is a 402 km long river in north-central British Columbia flowing north and thence south from Thutade Lake in the Omineca Mountains to Williston Lake, the impounded waters of the Peace River formed by the completion of the W.A.C. Bennett Dam in 1968.  Prior to this, the Finlay joined with the Parsnip River to form the Peace.  The headwaters of the Finlay at Thutade Lake are considered the ultimate source of the Mackenzie River.  Deserters Canyon is located just north of Williston Lake.

The Finlay drains an area of 43,000 square kilometres and discharges at a mean rate of 600 cubic metres per second.  Major tributaries of the Finlay include the Ospika, Ingenika, Warneford, Fox, Toodoggone, and Firesteel Rivers (the Ospika now enters Lake Williston directly, however).  Located in a remote part of the province, there are no population centres along the river, however, there is a small First Nations community, Fort Ware, located at the junction of the Finlay and Warneford.  Tatlatui Provincial Park protects the area of the Tatlatui Range, where Thutade Lake is located.

The Finlay River is named for the explorer John Finlay, who travelled a short way up the river in 1797.  The first European to journey its length to its source was the fur trader and explorer Samuel Black in 1824.  The river was the eastern half of the northern boundary of the Colony of British Columbia at the time of its creation in 1858, north of which was the North-Western Territory; the western half of the boundary was the Nass River and from 1862 to 1863 it was briefly the southern boundary of the Stickeen Territories (Stikine Territory) which had been formed from the North-Western Territory in response to the Peace and Stikine Gold Rushes and which was amalgamated with the Colony of British Columbia in the following year.

Tributaries
Firesteel River
Toodoggone River
Fox River
Kwadacha River
Paul River
Akie River
Ingenika River
Davis River
Mesilinka River
Osilinka River

References

External links
A book about the exploration of the Finlay River

Northern Interior of British Columbia
Rivers of the Omineca Mountains
Cassiar Mountains
Hudson's Bay Company trading posts
Cassiar Land District